USS Azalea is a name used more than once by the U.S. Navy:

 , a Civil War armed tugboat, commissioned in 1864.
 , a lighthouse tender built at New York City in 1891.
 , a wooden-hulled motor launch built in 1915 at Wilmington, California.

References 
 

United States Navy ship names